The men's javelin throw event at the 2021 European Athletics U23 Championships was held in Tallinn, Estonia, at Kadriorg Stadium on 9 and 11 July.

Records
Prior to the competition, the records were as follows:

Results

Qualification
Qualification rule: 77.00 (Q) or the 12 best results (q) qualified for the final.

Final

References

Javelin throw
Javelin throw at the European Athletics U23 Championships